was one of the most prominent Japanese photographers in the first half of the 20th century in Japan.

As an amateur photographer, he was very energetic in photography groups, such as Naniwa Photography Club (Naniwa Shashin Kurabu) and Tampei Photography Club.

In 1937, he founded Avant-Garde Image Group (Avant-Garde Zoei Shūdan) with Gingo Hanawa (1894–1957), Yoshio Tarui and Kōrō Honjō.

He was good at extremely imaginative, illusionary and surrealistic photography, perfectly using photomontages and color painting on prints.  His works such as "Fantasies of the Moon" (1938), "Mode" (1938, Mōdo) and "Life" (1938, Seimei) are unique and among the most important works for the history of Japanese photography before World War II.

References 
Kaneko Ryūichi. Modern Photography in Japan 1915-1940. San Francisco: Friends of Photography, 2001. 
Tucker, Anne Wilkes, et al. The History of Japanese Photography. New Haven: Yale University Press, 2003. 
 Exhibition Catalogue for The Founding and Development of Modern Photography in Japan, Tokyo Metropolitan Museum of Photography, 1995 (no ISBN). This catalogue reproduces "Fantasies of the Moon", "Mode" and "Life".
 Kiyoshi Koishi and avant-garde photography Nihon no shashinka ("Japanese Photographers"), volume 15. Tokyo: Iwanami Shoten, 1999. 

1900 births
1970 deaths
Japanese photographers
People from Osaka Prefecture